Financial inclusion is defined as the availability and equality of opportunities to access financial services. It refers to a process by which individuals and businesses can access appropriate, affordable, and timely financial products and services. These include banking, loan, equity, and insurance products. Financial inclusion efforts typically target those who are unbanked and underbanked, and directs sustainable financial services to them. Financial inclusion is understood to go beyond merely opening a bank account. It is possible for banked individuals to be excluded from financial services. Having more inclusive financial systems has been linked to stronger and more sustainable economic growth and development and thus achieving financial inclusion has become a priority for many countries across the globe.

In 2018, it was estimated that about 1.7 billion adults lacked a bank account. Among those who are un-banked a significant number were women and poor people in rural areas and often those who are excluded from financial institutions, face discrimination and belong to vulnerable or marginalized populations.

Due to the lack of financial infrastructure many under-served and low-income communities suffer. Specifically, the lack of proper information can be detrimental to low-income communities and expose them to financial risks. For instance, payday loans target low-income persons who are not adequately informed about interest rates and compound interest. They become trapped and indebted to these predatory institutions.

The public sector spearheads outreach and education for adults to receive free financial services such as education, tax preparation, and welfare assistance. Non-profit organizations dedicate themselves to serving underprivileged communities through private resources and state funding. Within California, state legislation allows for grants to be disbursed during the fiscal year and non-profits can apply for additional funding. Bill AB-423 is an example of the state recognizing the lack of financial inclusion of young adults, the bill encourages pupil instruction and financial literacy lessons to begin as early as grade 9.

While it is recognized that not all individuals need or want financial services, the goal of financial inclusion is to remove all barriers, both supply side and demand side. Supply side barriers stem from financial institutions themselves. They often indicate poor financial infrastructure, and include lack of nearby financial institutions, high costs to opening accounts, or documentation requirements. Demand side barriers refer to aspects of the individual seeking financial services and include poor financial literacy, lack of financial capability, or cultural or religious beliefs that impact their financial decisions.

There is some skepticism from some experts about the effectiveness of financial inclusion initiatives. Research on microfinance initiatives indicates that wide availability of credit for micro-entrepreneurs can produce informal inter-mediation, an unintended form of entrepreneurship.

History
The term "financial inclusion" has gained importance since the early 2000s, a result of identifying financial exclusion and it is a direct correlation to poverty according to the World Bank. The United Nations defines the goals of financial inclusion as follows:

 Access at a reasonable cost for all households to a full range of financial services, including savings or deposit services, payment and transfer services, credit and insurance.
 Sound and safe institutions governed by clear regulation and industry performance standards.
 Financial and institutional sustainability, to ensure continuity and certainty of investment.
 Competition to ensure choice and affordability for clients.

Former United Nations Secretary-General Kofi Annan, on 29 December 2003, said: "The stark reality is that most poor people in the world still lack access to sustainable financial services, whether it is savings, credit or insurance. The great challenge is to address the constraints that exclude people from full participation in the financial sector. Together, we can build inclusive financial sectors that help people improve their lives."

In 2009, former United Nations Secretary-General Ban Ki-Moon appointed Queen Máxima of the Netherlands as the United Nations Secretary-General’s Special Advocate for Inclusive Finance for Development (UNSGSA), housed in the United Nations Development Programme (UNDP). As the UN Secretary-General's Special Advocate, Queen Máxima is a leading global voice on advancing universal access to and responsible usage of affordable, effective and safe financial services.

Since 2011, more than 1.2 billion people have gained access to financial services—and therefore have a better chance to transform their lives. Leading up to the adoption of the Sustainable Development Goals (SDGs) in 2015, the UNSGSA and UN member-state partners worked to ensure financial inclusion’s strong presence within the agenda. As a result financial inclusion is now referenced in seven of the 17 goals as a key enabler for fulfilling the SDGs, and the General Assembly has passed a resolution stressing its importance.

Over the last five years financial inclusion has made strong strides forward: 515 million more people gained access to financial services between 2014 and 2017; 50+ countries have adopted financial inclusion plans and strategies; the major global regulators—the standard-setting bodies (SSBs)—now regularly meet for the purpose of addressing financial inclusion; and, growing research is showing strong links between financial inclusion and major development goals.

Measurement of Financial Inclusion 
Several surveys and datasets have worked to measure various aspects of financial inclusion including access and usage of financial services.  Some sources, such as the World Bank's Global Findex database or the Gates foundation's Financial Inclusion Tracker Surveys are household surveys attempting to measure usage of financial services from the consumer's perspective.  Other data sources like the International Monetary Fund's Financial Access Surveys focus more on the firm side, measuring the supply of financial institutions in a country.  Still others focus more on the regulatory environment for financial access, such as the GSMA's Mobile Money Regulatory Index, or the World Bank's, now defunct, Doing Business Report.

These data have been used in a range of ways, from donor organizations, such as the Millennium Challenge Corporation incentivizing country governments to do more to improve financial inclusion, to individual countries better understanding where they need to target interventions.  The United Nations uses two of these indicators (from Findex and the Financial Access Surveys) to measure Sustainable Development Goal 8.10.

Initiatives by country

Financial inclusion in the Philippines
Four million unbanked Filipinos are seen to benefit from the nascent credit scoring industry, a development that is seen to serve the people that is classified at the bottom of the economy an easy access to credit once the service is available to the public. Marlo R. Cruz, president and chief executive officer of CIBI Information, Inc. (CIBI) as one of the accredited credit bureaus in the Philippines, highlighted that this is expected to unlock much economic potential in sectors of the economy that are crucial for inclusive growth.

As per Cruz, "Many people still do not realize that the value of having a credit opportunity is synonymous to generating financial power. Creditworthiness is the same as to owning a keycard that can be used in navigating to the society of better possibilities."

The Bangko Sentral ng Pilipinas (BSP) reports on Financial Inclusion Initiatives and Financial Inclusion in the Philippines summarizes the country's accomplishments and significant milestones in financial inclusion. These reports show that 4 out of 10 Filipinos saved money in 2015 (up from 2 out of 10 in 2009). Among Filipino adults, 24.5% never saved and only 31.3% (up from 26.6%) have an account at a formal financial institution. The lack of enough money was cited as the main reason for not having a bank account. While there has been significant progress, much more must be done.

As an emerging country with a sizeable number of people living in poverty, access to financial services is an important challenge. Based on a March 18, 2016 report from the Philippine Statistics Authority, the country's 2015 poverty incidence (the proportion of people below the poverty line versus the total population) is at 26.3% while the subsistence incidence (the proportion of Filipinos in extreme or subsistence poverty) is at 12.1%. This means that there are around 26 million Filipinos who are still living below the poverty line.

Financial inclusion in India

History 
The concept of financial inclusion, extending financial services to those who typically lack access, has been a goal for the Government of India since the 1950s.

The nationalization of banks, which occurred from the mid 1950s to the late 1960s, culminating in 1969 with the nationalization of 14 commercial banks by Prime Minister Indira Gandhi, brought banking facilities to previously unreached areas of the country. The "branching" of banks into rural areas increased lending for agriculture and other unserved rural populations and Indira Gandhi spoke of it as a tactic to "accelerate development" and to address poverty and unemployment.

The Lead Bank Scheme followed nationalization as a way to coordinate banks and credit institutions by districts to more comprehensively ensure that rural areas had their credit needs met. In 1975, the Government of India followed this with efforts to specifically reach rural areas by establishing Regional Rural Banks (RRBs) meant to exclusively meet demand in the rural economy and the number of RRBs has significantly increased over the years.

By the early 2000's, the term 'financial inclusion' was being used in the Indian context. In 2004 the Khan Commission, created by the Reserve Bank of India (RBI), investigated the state of financial inclusion in India and laid out a series of recommendations. In response, RBI Governor Y. Venugopal Reddy, expressed concern regarding the exclusion of millions from the formal financial system and urged banks to better align their existing practices with the objective of financial inclusion in both his annual and midterm policy statements. The RBI has continued in its efforts in conjunction with the Government of India to develop banking products, craft new regulations, and advocate for financial inclusion.

Since financial inclusion was established as a priority for the GOI and RBI, progress has been made. Mangalam, Puducherry became the first village in India where all households were provided banking facilities. States or union territories such as Puducherry, Himachal Pradesh and Kerala announced 100% financial inclusion in all their districts. The Indian Reserve Bank vision for 2020 is to open nearly 600 million new customers' accounts and service them through a variety of channels by leveraging on IT. However, illiteracy, low income savings, and lack of bank branches in rural areas remain a roadblock to financial inclusion in many states, and there is inadequate legal and financial structure.

Financial sector strategies 
In India, RBI initiated several measures to achieve greater financial inclusion.These rely on efforts of the financial sector.

No frills accounts (NFAs), now known as basic savings bank deposit accounts (BSBDAs) can be opened with zero or minimal balances, removing a cost barrier to banking. Banks are also meant to charge minimal overdraft fees on NFAs. The RBI continues to change and relax policies regarding these accounts in an effort to better serve bank customers.

Know-your-customer (KYC) requirements for opening bank accounts were relaxed for small accounts in August 2005, eliminating a documentation barrier to banking. The new procedure only requires an introduction by an account holder who has been subjected to the full KYC screening. Additionally, banks were permitted to accept more easily produced forms of documentation for proof of identity and address.

The business correspondents (BC) model was launched in January 2006, when the RBI permitted banks to engage intermediaries in the banking process. This model enables banks to service neglected areas by allowing intermediaries to facilitate transactions and deliver other banking services directly. Originally, a fairly limited number of entities, including NGO's and certain microfinance institutions were eligible to act as BCs, however in 2010 the list was expanded to include for-profit companies In 2018, operators of Common Service Centers(CSCs) who work with local governing gram panchayats also began working as BCs to further improve penetration of banking services.

Expanding financial technology, or fintech, has been proposed as an effective strategy to achieve financial inclusion. While incorporation of technology does pose some risks, it is being used to deliver banking services to those in rural and remote areas who are typically unserved. The United Nation 2030 Agenda for Sustainable Development (UN-2030-ASD) and the G20 High-Level Principles for Digital Financial Inclusion (G20-HLP-DFI) describes the importance of using Fintech to reduce financial exclusion and income inequality which means that the financial inclusion through Fintech may shows significant signs on the reduction of inequality. Banks have been advised to make effective use of information and communications technology (ICT), to provide banking services to people directly through the BC model where the accounts can be operated by even illiterate customers by using biometrics, thus ensuring the security of transactions and enhancing confidence in the banking system. In 2018 the World Bank and International Monetary Fund (IMF) launched the Bali Fintech Agenda to provide a framework for domestic policy discussions around deepening access to financial services in a variety of different contexts.

Unique credit cards are now offered by banks, the most popular being general purpose credit cards (GCCs), and Kisan credit cards. These unique cards offer credit to those in rural and semi-urban areas, farmers, and others with adjusted collateral and security requirements with the objective of providing hassle-free credit.

Electronic benefit transfer (EBT) is being implemented by banks at the advice of the RBI with the goal of reducing dependence on cash, lowering transaction costs, and address corruption.

Increasing the number of rural banks remains a priority for the RBI. In 2009, the RBI relaxed previous policies requiring authorization before opening new branches in the hopes that simplified authorization would increase branches in underserved areas. Beginning in 2011 the RBI required 25% of new branches opened in a given year be in unbanked rural areas centers to ensure a more even spread of banking facilities.

The self-help group (SHG) linkage model has also been proposed to improve financial inclusion by linking community groups to the formal banking sector through government programs, credit cooperatives, NGOs, or other microfinance institutions. Group-based models in which members pool their savings have also been seen as tools for social and economic empowerment, particularly when women are leaders and participants.

Government policy strategies 

The Mahatma Gandhi National Rural Employment Guarantee Act  (MGNREGA) is meant to provide supplemental employment at a guaranteed minimum wage and facilitate financial inclusion to empower women and rural laborers. While achieving financial inclusion is not its main goal, the program directly deposits wages into bank accounts as a way to limit corruption, speed delivery of benefits, and connect wage laborers to bank accounts.

The Pradhan Mantri Jan Dhan Yojana policy scheme was announced by Prime Minister Narendra Modi in his 2014 Independence Day Speech and launched in August 2014 in an effort to provide "universal access" to banking through the creation of basic banking accounts that come with other basic financial services. Modi informed all Indian banks of the initiative and declared it a national priority. On the inauguration day of the scheme, 1.5 crore (15 million) bank accounts were opened and since then, more than 18 million bank accounts have been created.

In 2016, the Government of India instituted a sweeping demonetisation policy in an attempt to stop corruption and the flow of black money. This move forced people to deposit their money into banks or see its value evaporate, with the goal of integrating citizens into a cashless and taxable economy and banking system. While India has seen new bank accounts continue to open in the wake of this policy change, and an overall increase in use of digital payment systems and other financial services, the policy change caused an extreme disruption to the financial system and debate continues on its efficacy.

Measuring financial inclusion 
Readily available data outlining gaps in access and contextualizing the situation of financial inclusion is necessary for both service providers and policy makers looking to achieve financial inclusion. Several organizations conduct surveys to measure indicators of financial inclusion and collect both supply and demand side data. MIX is one platform that produces data driven reports to track progress towards financial inclusion across the globe.

In 2013, Finance Minister of India, P. Chidambaram launched the CRISIL Inclusix, an index to measure the status of financial inclusion in India. CRISIL, India's leading credit rating and research company is collecting data from 666 districts in India and ranking on a scale from 0 to 100 based on four parameters of financial services. CRISIL publishes semi-frequent reports based on their findings with regional, state-wise, and district-wise assessments of financial inclusion.

Some key conclusions from the 2018 report are:

 The all-India CRISIL Inclusix score of 58.0 is above average as of April 2016, this is a significant improvement from 35.4 in 2009.
 Deposit penetration is the key driver of financial inclusion–the number of deposit accounts (1646 million) is almost eight times the number of credit accounts (196 million).
 The top three states are Kerala, Karnataka and Andhra Pradesh.

Controversy
Financial inclusion in India is often closely connected to the aggressive micro credit policies that were introduced without appropriate regulations, oversight, or consumer education policies. As a result, consumers quickly became over-indebted to the point of committing suicide and lending institutions saw repayment rates collapse after politicians in one of the country's largest states called on borrowers to stop paying back their loans. The crisis threatened the existence of the $4 billion Indian microcredit industry, has been compared to the subprime mortgage crisis in the United States. The crisis serves as a reminder of the necessity of appropriate regulatory and educational frameworks and it remains a challenge to separate microcredit from the large and complex field of financial inclusion. A report by Dvara Research also points to the exclusion in the Direct Benefit Transfer scheme of the Government.

Financial inclusion in Tanzania 
With a population of 55.57 million people and only 19% of its population enrolled into an account with a formal bank, Tanzania remains largely unbanked. Poverty alleviation is often linked with a given population's access to formal banking instruments, and mobile money can serve as a crucial bridge for offering savings, credit, and insurance to Tanzania's rural population.

In 2006 just 11% of Tanzanians had access to a financial account, but with the advent of digital financial services that number has increased to 60%. The current situation in Tanzania has improved steadily over the past 12 years with the introduction of mobile money by Tanzania's main telecom providers. The quick expansion of financial inclusion in Tanzania is almost entirely due to the proliferation of mobile banking options. While a recent cooling effect has taken place due to a government crackdown on counterfeit SIM cards, over half of Tanzania's population has access a degree of financial services through mobile banking.

Financial inclusion in the United States 
The United States began to adopt MFI (Microfinance) ideals in the late 1980s and early 1990s. Compared to other countries, the United States was late to implement these changes, but nevertheless, once active the US had the experience of other countries to draw upon. According to the Board of Governors of the Federal Reserve System, the expansion opened a new avenue to disadvantaged communities, primarily African Americans to "expand economic opportunities and to foster community economic development". This action is tailored to the needs of low- to moderate-income entrepreneurs. One criticism of MFI in the US is that its services didn't extend outside of providing credit, where other MFI programs overseas "extended their offerings to deliver education, training, and other relevant services". To address this gap, MFI non-profit organizations emerged, many focused on specific minority populations, such as African Americans, who are excluded from mainstream credit.

Racial inequality in the United States reduces the opportunity for African Americans to receive financial support compared to White Americans. This is due to the preexisting conflicts in the US that continue to remain relevant in the modern world. Organizations such as Main Street Launch, an Oakland, California–based microfinance organization centered on empowering African American entrepreneurs, were able to flourish due to the value they brought to local communities. The big banks viewed microfinance organizations as a "tax incentive", considering the money they offered these organizations was exempted by the US government. Another beneficial aspect that these MFI organizations brought was economic prosperity to entrepreneurs and most importantly to their local community. Through the empowerment of their local communities, MFI organizations are able to reach larger marginalized communities to support and promote upward mobility. Over the past several decades that MFI organizations have been operating within the United States, they have loaned over several billions over dollars (~15 billion) and have had a ~97% repayment rate.

During the COVID-19 pandemic, digital financial exclusion has become more prominent in the US as some businesses no longer accept cash for purchases.

Financial inclusion in Indonesia 
Indonesia's national strategy for financial inclusion was established in 2016. The strategy is a guideline for all government institutions in Indonesia and private stakeholders to improve public access to financial services. Priority segments of Indonesia's financial inclusion programs are:

 The lowest income families, particularly those with limited access to financial services or without access at all;
 Micro businesses and small entrepreneurs with limited resources to expand their business; and
 Female, people with disability as well as migrant workers, communities in disadvantaged and remote areas, the elderly, former convicts, homeless communities, students and youth.

By the end of 2019, 75 percent of adult population in Indonesia is expected to have access to formal financial services. The National Council for Financial Inclusion, led by the President of Indonesia, is established to coordinate and synchronize the implementation of the strategy, to determine plans and policies in solving problems and obstacles within the implementation as well as to support governors and regent/mayors in determining regional financial inclusion policies at provincial and district/city levels.

In 2019, 76.19% of adult population in Indonesia were said to have accessed financial services.

Digital financial inclusion
Technology-enabled innovations represent an opportunity to promote financial inclusion. Inclusive digital financial services refer to mobile money, online accounts, electronic payments, insurance and credit, combinations of them and newer financial technology (fintech) apps, which can reach people who were formerly excluded. For example, digital financial services can provide low-income households with access to affordable and convenient tools that can help increase their economic opportunities or access to credit.

There is evidence that digital financial services can empower women to earn more and build assets, helping address that 35% of women worldwide—approximately 980 million—remain excluded from the formal financial system. Digital financial services have been shown to help give women greater control over their own finances, including safe, convenient, and discreet access to banking accounts. This greater financial power can increase gender equality and economic growth.

Tracking financial inclusion through budget analysis
While financial inclusion is an important issue, it may also be interesting to assess whether such inclusion as earmarked in policies are actually reaching the common beneficiaries. Since the 1990s, there has been serious efforts both in the government agencies and in the civil society to monitor the fund flow process and to track the outcome of public expenditure through budget tracking. Organisations like International Budget Partnership (IBP) are undertaking global surveys in more than 100 countries to study the openness (transparency) in budget making process. There are various tools used by different civil society groups to track public expenditure. Such tools may include performance monitoring of public services, social audit and public accountability surveys. In India, the institutionalisation of Right to information (RTI) has been a supporting tool for activists and citizen groups for budget tracking and advocacy for social inclusion.

Financial inclusion and bank stability
The theoretical and empirical evidences on the link between financial inclusion and bank stability are limited. Banking literature indicates several potential channels through which financial inclusion may influence bank stability. A recent study appeared in Journal Economic Behavior & Organization a robust positive association between financial inclusion and bank stability. The authors show that the positive association is more pronounced with those banks that have higher retail deposit funding share and lower marginal costs of providing banking services; and also with those that operate in countries with stronger institutional quality.

Evidence on the effectiveness of financial inclusion interventions
Results from research on the effectiveness of financial inclusion programs to improve economic, social, behavioral and gender-related outcomes in low- and middle-income countries have been mixed and programs to improve access to financial services often have small or inconsistent effects on income, health, and other social outcomes. Programs geared toward savings opportunities have had small but more consistently positive effects, and fewer risks, than credit-oriented programs.

See also 
 AFI Global Policy Forum
 Alliance for Financial Inclusion
 Financial deepening
 Financial ethics
 Financial social work
 The Maya Declaration

References

 Collins, J. M. (2011). Improving financial literacy: The role of nonprofit providers. Financial Literacy: Implications for Retirement Security and the Financial Marketplace, 268–287. https://doi.org/10.1093/acprof:oso/9780199696819.003.0015
 https://leginfo.legislature.ca.gov/faces/billTextClient.xhtml?bill_id=202120220AB423

Microfinance
Banking
Banking terms